Irina-Camelia Begu and Nina Bratchikova were the defending champions, but both decided not to participate.

Séverine Beltrame and Laura Thorpe won the title, defeating Kristina Barrois and Olga Savchuk in the final, 6–1, 6–4.

Seeds

Draw

Draw

References
 Main Draw

Open GDF Suez de Marseille - Doubles